The Peugeot Concours Design competition was a biennial competition run by the French car manufacturer Peugeot. For each competition, entrants had to submit their designs for a car. A model of the winning design was built by the Peugeot Styling Centre and unveiled at the Frankfurt Motor Show. The last competition took place in 2008.

History
The first contest took place in 2000-2001, with the theme "2020" - a challenge to design a Peugeot car for the year 2020. The contest was announced at the Paris Motor Show in 2000, and culminated in the winning design being built by Peugeot, and unveiled at the Frankfurt Motor Show in 2001.  Since then, the contest has followed a similar schedule every two years. For the 2006-2007 contest, the winning design featured in an Xbox 360 game.

Themes
Each contest has a theme, which contestants must follow when creating their designs:
2000-2001 "2020" - a concept car for the year 2020
2002-2003 "Retrofuturism"
2004-2005 "Design the Peugeot you dream of seeing in the near future"
2006-2007 "P.L.E.A.S.E." - stands for Pleasurable (to drive), Lively, Efficient, Accessible, Simple, Ecological
2008-2009 "Imagine the Peugeot in the worldwide megalopolis of tomorrow"

Rules
The contest runs to a similar schedule, with similar rules, each year. In 2008, the contest opened in June, with the deadline for submissions on July 20. When the deadline for submissions has passed, Peugeot selects 30 entries to go forward to the next stage. These 30 entries are placed on the competition's website and are voted on by visitors to the site and selected industry and press figures. Based on these votes, these 30 entries are narrowed down to ten entries and these entries are posted to the website. This stage is not a majority vote - the ten entries which are selected may not be the highest-voted entries.

In the final stage of voting, the Peugeot Jury select the winner and 2nd and 3rd runners-up from the final ten. The results of this are then posted to the competition's website, usually some time in February.

Prizes
In the 2008-2009 contest, the prize structure will be as follows:

1st place
€10,000
Xbox 360 console
"La Griffe" trophy, presented at the Geneva Motor Show
A 1:43 scale model of the previous contest's winning entry, made by Norev to be sold as merchandise
Construction of a full-scale model of the winning entry to be entered in two auto shows (see below)
Inclusion of their design in a forthcoming Xbox 360 game
Accommodation and expenses to attend the two motor shows
Entry to the Shanghai Motor Show 2009
Entry to the Mondial de Paris 2008

2nd place
€2,500
Xbox 360 console
A 1:43 scale model of the previous contest's winning entry

3rd place
€1,500
Xbox 360 console
A 1:43 scale model of the previous contest's winning entry

4th-10th place
€1,000
A 1:43 scale model of the previous contest's winning entry

11th-30th place
€300

Winners

2000-2001
The winner of the 2000-2001 competition was Moonster by Marko Lukovic. The concept behind this design was that the vehicle should be totally original. It features a wheel-level engine with a raised central compartment capable of seating two people.

2002-2003
This contest, themed "Retrofuturism", was won by Stefan Schulze with 4002. With this design, the artist intended to make the car look like a typical Peugeot. Many commentators felt that he was successful with this, citing the design of the headlights as particularly Peugeot-like.

2004-2005
This contest was won by André Costa with Moovie. His was a bubble-shaped 2-door, 2-seat city car, almost totally enclosed by glass. The creator has stated that the car was designed to be environmentally friendly and ideal for use in cities.

2006-2007
The 2006-2007 competition was won by Mihai Panaitescu with his design, Flux. According to its creator, the car is intended to be sporty and versatile, and able to handle many different environments with ease. Flux is meant to symbolise "the continuous change and flow of our daily lives during work and play" - to this end, the car contains an integrated Xbox 360 console.

See also

 List of motor vehicle awards
 Automotive design
Paris Motor Show
Geneva Motor Show
Frankfurt Motor Show
Peugeot
Inducement prize contest

References

External links
Peugeot Concours Design (English site)
Moonster home page
Peugeot (English site)

Automotive design
Design awards
Experimental vehicles